United Nations Security Council resolution 734, adopted unanimously on 29 January 1992, after recalling previous resolutions on the topic, as well as studying the report by the Secretary-General on the United Nations Interim Force in Lebanon (UNIFIL) approved in 426 (1978), the Council decided to extend the mandate of UNIFIL for a further six months until 31 July 1992.

The Council then reemphasised the mandate of the Force and requested the Secretary-General to report back on the progress made with regard to the implementation of resolutions 425 (1978) and 426 (1978). It also required him to examine ways of improving the effectiveness of the Force.

See also 
 Israeli–Lebanese conflict
 Lebanese Civil War
 List of United Nations Security Council Resolutions 701 to 800 (1991–1993)
 South Lebanon conflict (1985–2000)

References
Text of the Resolution at undocs.org

External links
 

 0734
 0734
Israeli–Lebanese conflict
1992 in Israel
1992 in Lebanon
Arab–Israeli peace process
 0734
January 1992 events